Joseph Anthony Ferrario (March 3, 1926 – December 12, 2003) was the third bishop of the Roman Catholic Diocese of Honolulu and served from 1982 to 1993.

Early life and priestly ministry
Born in Scranton, Pennsylvania, Ferrario was ordained to the priesthood on May 19, 1951 at the age of 25. Part of a religious order of educators, the Sulpicians, Ferrario taught at various schools and seminaries.

Auxiliary bishop
On staff at the Saint Stephen Diocesan Seminary, Honolulu on the island of O`ahu, Ferrario was appointed auxiliary bishop of Honolulu on November 8, 1977. On January 13, 1978, he was consecrated titular bishop of Cusae and auxiliary to the Bishop of Honolulu.

Msgr. Charles Kekumano, Hawai‘i's first native-born priest named a domestic prelate by Pope John XXIII, left the diocese to work in the Diocese of Juneau in Alaska when Ferrario was elevated to the episcopate.

Bishop of Honolulu 
With his predecessor's retirement, Bishop Ferrario was appointed Bishop of Honolulu on May 13, 1982. One of his first actions as the ordinary of Honolulu was the removal of Msgr. Francis A. Marzen as editor of the diocesan newspaper, the Hawai‘i Catholic Herald. Msgr. Marzen had served as editor of the newspaper for approximately twenty years under the two previous bishops and publicly complained of his dismissal in an acerbic parting editorial published in the Hawai‘i Catholic Herald.

Bishop Ferrario revamped major diocesan offices and appointed pastors to parishes that were supportive of his vision of implementing the Second Vatican Ecumenical Council. Ferrario's work in renewing the Honolulu diocese earned him the respect of many people in the Church in Hawai‘i.

Decree of excommunication
Bishop Ferrario's harshest critics were the conservative followers of the Archbishop Marcel Lefebvre's Priestly Society of Saint Pius X. Bishop Ferrario, through his judicial vicar, Father Joseph Bukoski, J.C.L., issued a canonical decree of excommunication to six individuals in 1991. Joseph Cardinal Ratzinger as Prefect of the Congregation for the Doctrine of the Faith later reversed Bishop Ferrario's action.

Retirement 
In 1993, Bishop Ferrario retired from active ministry. The Vatican appointed Bishop Francis Xavier DiLorenzo, S.T.D., Titular Bishop of Tigia and Auxiliary of Scranton, as Apostolic Administrator of the Diocese of Honolulu, after accepting Msgr. Ferrario's resignation from the See of Honolulu, for health reasons.

The simultaneous notice of the Vatican's acceptance of the retirement of Bishop Ferrario for health reasons and the appointment of Bishop DiLorenzo as Apostolic Administrator was read at solemn vespers at the Cathedral of Our Lady of Peace, on October 12, 1993. Bishop DiLorenzo would serve as Apostolic Administrator until his appointment as Bishop of Honolulu in 1994.

After retirement, Msgr. Ferrario resided near Saint Anthony of Padua Church in Kailua and continued his charitable work with the Augustine Educational Foundation.  He kept a vigorous schedule to raise money for Catholic education in the Hawaiian Islands through the Augustine Educational Foundation.

Death
He died of cardiac arrest on December 12, 2003, aged 77, and was buried at Hawaiian Memorial Park in Kane‘ohe. He was remembered for his compassion for the poor children in the Diocese of Honolulu.

References

1926 births
2003 deaths
20th-century American educators
Roman Catholic bishops of Honolulu
American people of Italian descent
People from Scranton, Pennsylvania
20th-century Roman Catholic bishops in the United States
Catholics from Pennsylvania
Educators from Pennsylvania